Sumie (also released as The Personal Aspect in Jazz) is a jazz album recorded by the Toshiko Akiyoshi Quartet in Tokyo in early March 1971 and released by Victor (Japan) Records.   It is not to be confused with the 1979 release, Sumie by the Toshiko Akiyoshi – Lew Tabackin Big Band.

Track listing
Side 'A'
"Sumie" (Akiyoshi)
"P.A.J."
Side 'B'
"Euphoria" (Akiyoshi)

Personnel
Toshiko Akiyoshi – piano
Lew Tabackin – tenor saxophone, flute
Lyn Christie – bass
Albert Heath – drums

References / external links
Victor SPX 1040 (Sumie)
Victor CD4B-5007 (The Personal Aspect in Jazz)

Toshiko Akiyoshi albums
1971 albums